The Vietnamese alphabet is the modern Latin writing script or writing system for Vietnamese. It uses the Latin script based on Romance languages originally developed by Portuguese missionary Francisco de Pina (1585 – 1625).

The Vietnamese alphabet contains 29 letters, including seven letters using four diacritics: ă, â/ê/ô, ơ/ư, đ. There are an additional five diacritics used to designate tone (as in à, á, ả, ã, and ạ). The complex vowel system and the large number of letters with diacritics, which can stack twice on the same letter (e.g. nhất meaning "first"), makes it easy to distinguish the Vietnamese orthography from other writing systems that use the Latin script.

The Vietnamese system's use of diacritics produces an accurate transcription for tones despite the limitations of the Roman alphabet. On the other hand, sound changes in the spoken language have led to different letters, digraphs and trigraphs now representing the same sounds.



Letter names and pronunciation

Vietnamese uses all the letters of the ISO basic Latin alphabet except for f, j, w, and z. These letters are only used to write loanwords, languages of other ethnic groups in the country based on Vietnamese phonetics to differentiate the meanings or even Vietnamese dialects, for example: dz or z for southerner pronunciation of v in standard Vietnamese.

In total, there are 12 vowels (nguyên âm) and 17 consonants (phụ âm, literally "extra sound").

Notes
 The vowels in the table are italicized.
 Q and q is always followed by u in every word and phrase in Vietnamese, e.g.  (trousers),  (to attract), etc.
 The name  for y is from the French name for the letter:  (Greek I), referring to the letter's origin from the Greek letter upsilon. The other obsolete French pronunciations include e and u.
 The Vietnamese alphabet does not contain the letters F (ép, ép-phờ), J (gi), W (u kép meaning "double u", vê kép, vê đúp meaning "double v") or Z (giét). However, these letters are often used for foreign loanwords or may be kept for foreign names.
"Y" is most commonly treated as a vowel along with "i". "i" is "short " and "y" is "long ". "Y" can have tones as well as other vowels (ý, ỳ, ỹ, ỷ, ỵ) e.g. Mỹ (America). It may also act as a consonant (when used after â and a). It can sometimes be used to replace "i", e.g. "bánh mì" (bread) can also be written "bánh mỳ".
S and X are similar to each other in sound in Vietnamese and can sometimes replace each other e.g. sương xáo or sương sáo (grass jelly).

Consonants
The alphabet is largely derived from Portuguese with major influence from French, although the usage of gh and gi was borrowed from Italian (compare) and that for c/k/qu from Greek and Latin (compare ,), mirroring the English usage of these letters (compare ,).

Vowels

Pronunciation

The correspondence between the orthography and pronunciation is somewhat complicated. In some cases, the same letter may represent several different sounds, and different letters may represent the same sound.  This is because the orthography was designed centuries ago and the spoken language has changed, as shown in the chart directly above that contrasts the difference between Middle and Modern Vietnamese.

The letters y and i are mostly equivalent, and there is no concrete rule that says when to use one or the other, except in sequences like ay and uy (i.e. tay "arm, hand" is read as  while tai "ear" is read as ). There have been attempts since the late 20th century to standardize the orthography by replacing all the vowel uses of y with i, the latest being a decision from the Vietnamese Ministry of Education in 1984.  These efforts seem to have had limited effect. In textbooks published by Nhà Xuất bản Giáo dục ("Publishing House of Education"), y is used to represent  only in Sino-Vietnamese words that are written with one letter y alone (diacritics can still be added, as in ý, ỷ), at the beginning of a syllable when followed by ê (as in yếm, yết), after u and in the sequence ay; therefore such forms as *lý and *kỹ are not "standard", though they are much preferred elsewhere. Most people and the popular media continue to use the spelling that they are most accustomed to.

The uses of the letters i and y to represent the phoneme  can be categorized as "standard" (as used in textbooks published by Nhà Xuất bản Giáo dục) and "non-standard" as follows.

This "standard" set by Nhà Xuất bản Giáo dục is not definite. It is unknown why the literature books use Lí while the history books use Lý.

Spelling

Vowel nuclei

The table below matches the vowels of Hanoi Vietnamese (written in the IPA) and their respective orthographic symbols used in the writing system.

{| class="wikitable"
! rowspan="2" |
! colspan="2" | Front
! colspan="2" | Central
! colspan="2" | Back
|-
! Sound
! Spelling
! Sound
! Spelling
! Sound
! Spelling
|- align=center
! Centering
| align=center |  || iê/ia*
| align=center |  || ươ/ưa*
| align=center |  || uô/ua*
|- align=center
! Close
| align=center |  || i, y
| align=center |  || ư
| align=center |  || u
|- align=center
! rowspan="2" | Close-mid/Mid
| align=center rowspan="2" |  || rowspan="2" | ê
| align=center |  || ơ
| align=center rowspan="2" |  || rowspan="2" | ô
|- align=center
| align=center |  || â
|- align=center
! rowspan="2" | Open-mid/Open
| align=center rowspan="2" |  || rowspan="2" | e
| align=center |  || a
| align=center rowspan="2" |  || rowspan="2" | o
|- align=center
| align=center |  || ă
|}

Notes:

The vowel  is:
usually written i:  = sĩ (A suffix indicating profession, similar to the English suffix -er).
sometimes written y after h, k, l, m, n, s, t, v, x:  = Mỹ (America)
It is always written y when:
 preceded by an orthographic vowel:  = khuyên 'to advise';
 at the beginning of a word derived from Chinese (written as i otherwise):  = yêu 'to love'.
The vowel  is written oo before c or ng (since o in that position represents ):  = oóc 'organ (musical)';  = kính coong. This generally only occurs in recent loanwords or when representing dialectal pronunciation.
Similarly, the vowel  is written ôô before c or ng:  = ôông (Nghệ An/Hà Tĩnh variant of ông ). But unlike oo being frequently used in onomatopoeia, transcriptions from other languages and words "borrowed" from Nghệ An/Hà Tĩnh dialects (such as voọc), ôô seems to be used solely to convey the feel of the Nghệ An/Hà Tĩnh accents. In transcriptions, ô is preferred (e.g. các-tông 'cardboard', ắc-coóc-đê-ông 'accordion').

Diphthongs and triphthongs
{| class="wikitable"  align="center"
|- align="center"
! colspan="2" |
! Rising Vowels
! Rising-Falling Vowels
! colspan="2" | Falling Vowels
|- align="center"
!
! nucleus (V)
!  on-glides
!  + V + off-glide
|- align="center"
! rowspan="4" | front
! e
|  oe/(q)ue* ||  oeo/(q)ueo* || ||  eo
|- align="center"
! ê
|  uê || || ||  êu
|- align="center"
! i
|  uy ||  uyu || ||  iu
|- align="center"
! ia/iê/yê*
|  uyê/uya* || || || align="center" |  iêu/yêu*
|- align="center"
! rowspan="6" | central
! a
|  oa/(q)ua* ||  oai/(q)uai,  oao/(q)uao* ||  ai ||  ao
|- align="center"
! ă
|  oă/(q)uă* ||  oay/(q)uay* ||  ay ||  au
|- align="center"
! â
|  uâ ||  uây ||  ây ||  âu
|- align="center"
! ơ
|  uơ || ||  ơi ||  ơu
|- align="center"
! ư
| || ||  ưi ||  ưu
|- align="center"
! ưa/ươ*
| || ||  ươi ||  ươu
|- align="center"
! rowspan="4" | back
! o
| || ||  oi ||
|- align="center"
! ô
| || ||  ôi ||
|- align="center"
! u
| || ||  ui ||
|- align="center"
! ua/uô*
| || ||  uôi ||
|}

Notes:

The glide  is written:
u after  (spelled q in this instance)
o in front of a, ă, or e except after q
o following a and e
u in all other cases; note that  is written as au instead of *ău (cf. ao ), and that  is written as y after u

The off-glide  is written as i except after â and ă, where it is written as y; note that  is written as ay instead of *ăy (cf. ai ) .

The diphthong  is written:
ia at the end of a syllable:  = mía 'sugar cane'
iê before a consonant or off-glide:  = miếng 'piece';  = xiêu 'to slope, slant'
Note that the i of the diphthong changes to y after u:
ya:  = khuya 'late at night'
yê:  = khuyên 'to advise'
iê changes to yê at the beginning of a syllable (ia does not change):
 = yên 'calm';  yếu''' 'weak, feeble'

The diphthong  is written:ua at the end of a syllable:  = mua 'to buy'uô before a consonant or off-glide:  = muôn 'ten thousand';  = xuôi 'down'

The diphthong  is written:ưa at the end of a syllable:  = mưa 'to rain'ươ before a consonant or off-glide:  = mương 'irrigation canal';  = tưới 'to water, irrigate, sprinkle'

Tone marks
Vietnamese is a tonal language, so the meaning of each word depends on the pitch in which it is pronounced. Tones are marked in the IPA as suprasegmentals following the phonemic value. Some tones are also associated with a glottalization pattern.

There are six distinct tones in the standard northern dialect. The first one ("level tone") is not marked and the other five are indicated by diacritics applied to the vowel part of the syllable. The tone names are chosen such that the name of each tone is spoken in the tone it identifies.

In the south, there is a merging of the hỏi and ngã tones, in effect leaving five tones.* = Z (in TELEX) and 0 (in VNI) keys are used to remove the mark. For example, in TELEX, AS => á, then press Z => a.
Unmarked vowels are pronounced with a level voice, in the middle of the speaking range.
The grave accent indicates that the speaker should start somewhat low and drop slightly in tone, with the voice becoming increasingly breathy.
The hook indicates in Northern Vietnamese that the speaker should start in the middle range and fall, but in Southern Vietnamese that the speaker should start somewhat low and fall, then rise (as when asking a question in English).
In the North, a tilde indicates that the speaker should start mid, break off (with a glottal stop), then start again and rise like a question in tone. In the South, it is realized identically to the Hỏi tone.
The acute accent indicates that the speaker should start mid and rise sharply in tone.
The dot or cross signifies in Northern Vietnamese that the speaker starts low and fall lower in tone, with the voice becoming increasingly creaky and ending in a glottal stop.

In syllables where the vowel part consists of more than one vowel (such as diphthongs and triphthongs), the placement of the tone is still a matter of debate.  Generally, there are two methodologies, an "old style" and a "new style".  While the "old style" emphasizes aesthetics by placing the tone mark as close as possible to the center of the word (by placing the tone mark on the last vowel if an ending consonant part exists and on the next-to-last vowel if the ending consonant doesn't exist, as in hóa, hủy), the "new style" emphasizes linguistic principles and tries to apply the tone mark on the main vowel (as in hoá, huỷ). In both styles, when one vowel already has a quality diacritic on it, the tone mark must be applied to it as well, regardless of where it appears in the syllable (thus  thuế is acceptable while *thúê is not).  In the case of the ươ diphthong, the mark is placed on the ơ. The u in qu is considered part of the consonant. Currently, the new style is usually used in textbooks published by Nhà Xuất bản Giáo dục, while most people still prefer the old style in casual uses. Among Overseas Vietnamese communities, the old style is predominant for all purposes.

In lexical ordering, differences in letters are treated as primary, differences in tone markings as secondary and differences in case as tertiary differences. (Letters include for instance A and Ă but not Ẳ. Older dictionaries also treated digraphs and trigraphs like CH and NGH as base letters.) Ordering according to primary and secondary differences proceeds syllable by syllable. According to this principle, a dictionary lists tuân thủ before tuần chay because the secondary difference in the first syllable takes precedence over the primary difference in the second syllable.

Structure
In the past, syllables in multisyllabic words were concatenated with hyphens, but this practice has died out and hyphenation is now reserved for word-borrowings from other languages. A written syllable consists of at most three parts, in the following order from left to right:
An optional beginning consonant part
A required vowel syllable nucleus and the tone mark, if needed, applied above or below it
An ending consonant part, can only be one of the following: c, ch, m, n, ng, nh, p, t, or nothing.

History

Since the beginning of the Chinese rule 111 BC, literature, government papers, scholarly works, and religious scripture were all written in classical Chinese (chữ Hán) while indigenous writing in chữ Hán started around the ninth century. The system was based on chữ Hán, but was also supplemented with Vietnamese-invented characters (proper Nôm characters) to represent native Vietnamese words.

 Creation of chữ Quốc ngữ 
As early as 1620, with the work of Francisco de Pina, Portuguese and Italian Jesuit missionaries in Vietnam began using Latin script to transcribe the Vietnamese language as an assistance for learning the language. The work was continued by the Avignonese Alexandre de Rhodes. Building on previous dictionaries by Gaspar do Amaral and Antonio Barbosa, Rhodes compiled the Dictionarium Annamiticum Lusitanum et Latinum, a Vietnamese–Portuguese–Latin dictionary, which was later printed in Rome in 1651, using their spelling system. These efforts led eventually to the development of the present Vietnamese alphabet. For 200 years, chữ Quốc ngữ was used within the Catholic community.

 Colonial period 
In 1910, the French colonial administration enforced chữ Quốc ngữ. The Latin alphabet then became a means to publish Vietnamese popular literature, which was disparaged as vulgar by the Chinese-educated imperial elites. Historian Pamela A. Pears asserted that by instituting the Latin alphabet in Vietnam, the French cut the Vietnamese from their traditional Hán Nôm literature. An important reason why Latin script became the standard writing system in Vietnam but not in Cambodia and Laos, which were both dominated by the French for a similar amount of time under the same colonial framework, had to do with the Nguyễn Emperors of Vietnam heavily promoting its usage. According to the historian Liam Kelley in his 2016 work "Emperor Thành Thái’s Educational Revolution" neither the French nor the revolutionaries had enough power to spread the usage of chữ Quốc ngữ down to the village level. It was by imperial decree in 1906 of Emperor Thành Thái, that parents could decide whether their children will follow a curriculum in Hán văn (漢文) or Nam âm (南音, "Southern sound", the contemporary Vietnamese name for chữ Quốc ngữ). This decree was issued at the same time when other social changes, such as the cutting of long male hair, were occurring. The main reason for the popularisation of the Latin alphabet in Vietnam/Đại Nam during the Nguyễn dynasty (the French protectorates of Annam and Tonkin) was because of the pioneering efforts by intellectuals from French Cochinchina combined with the progressive and scientific policies of the French government in French Indochina, that created the momentum for the usage of chữ Quốc ngữ to spread.

Since the 1920s, the Vietnamese mostly use chữ Quốc ngữ, and new Vietnamese terms for new items or words are often calqued from Hán Nôm. Some French had originally planned to replace Vietnamese with French, but this never was a serious project, given the small number of French settlers compared with the native population. The French had to reluctantly accept the use of chữ Quốc ngữ to write Vietnamese since this writing system, created by Portuguese missionaries, is based on Portuguese orthography, not French.

 Mass education 
Between 1907 and 1908, the short-lived Tonkin Free School promulgated chữ quốc ngữ and taught French language to the general population.

In 1917, the French system suppressed Vietnam's Confucian examination system, viewed as an aristocratic system linked with the "ancient regime", thereby forcing Vietnamese elites to educate their offspring in the French language education system. Emperor Khải Định declared the traditional writing system abolished in 1918.
While traditional nationalists favoured the Confucian examination system and the use of chữ Hán, Vietnamese revolutionaries, progressive nationalists, and pro-French elites viewed the French education system as a means to "liberate" the Vietnamese from old Chinese domination and the unsatisfactory "outdated" Confucian examination system, to democratize education and to help link Vietnamese to European philosophies.

The French colonial system then set up another educational system, teaching Vietnamese as a first language using chữ quốc ngữ in primary school and then the French language (taught in chữ quốc ngữ). Hundreds of thousands of textbooks for primary education began to be published in chữ quốc ngữ, with the unintentional result of turning the script into the popular medium for the expression for Vietnamese culture.

 Late 20th century to present 
Typesetting and printing Vietnamese has been challenging due to its number of accents/diacritics. Contemporary Vietnamese texts sometimes include words which have not been adapted to modern Vietnamese orthography, especially for documents written in chữ Hán. The Vietnamese language itself has been likened to a system akin to "ruby characters" elsewhere in Asia. See Vietnamese language and computers for usage on computers and the internet.

Computing
The universal character set Unicode has full support for the Latin Vietnamese writing system, although it does not have a separate segment for it. The required characters that other languages use are scattered throughout the Basic Latin, Latin-1 Supplement, Latin Extended-A and Latin Extended-B blocks; those that remain (such as the letters with more than one diacritic) are placed in the Latin Extended Additional block.  An ASCII-based writing convention, Vietnamese Quoted Readable and several byte-based encodings including VSCII (TCVN), VNI, VISCII and Windows-1258 were widely used before Unicode became popular.  Most new documents now exclusively use the Unicode format UTF-8.

Unicode allows the user to choose between precomposed characters and combining characters in inputting Vietnamese. Because in the past some fonts implemented combining characters in a nonstandard way (see Verdana font), most people use precomposed characters when composing Vietnamese-language documents (except on Windows where Windows-1258 used combining characters).

Most keyboards on modern phone and computer operating systems, including iOS, Android and MacOS, have now supported the Vietnamese language and direct input of diacritics by default. Previously, Vietnamese users had to manually install free softwares such as Unikey on computers or Laban Key on phones to type Vietnamese diacritics. These keyboards support input methods such as Telex, VNI, VIQR and its variants.

See also
Portuguese orthography
Special characters:
Ă, Â, Đ, Ê, Ô, Ơ, Ư
Dot (diacritic)
Hook above
Horn (diacritic)
Historic Writing
"Chữ Hán", classical Chinese written in Vietnam (Han characters)
"Chữ Nôm", former script used to write Vietnamese using Han and Nom (invented characters) words
Coding and Input Methods:
Telex, the oldest standard input method for the Vietnamese alphabet on electronic devices.
VNI, another input and encoding convention for Vietnamese alphabet.
VIQR, another standard 7-bit input method for Vietnamese alphabet.
VISCII, another standard 8-bit encoding for Vietnamese alphabet.
Unicode, character encoding standard for most of the world's writing systems
Vietnamese Braille
Vietnamese calligraphy
Vietnamese phonology
 Francisco de Pina
 Alexandre de Rhodes

References

Bibliography
Gregerson, Kenneth J. (1969). A study of Middle Vietnamese phonology. Bulletin de la Société des Etudes Indochinoises, 44, 135–193. (Published version of the author's MA thesis, University of Washington). (Reprinted 1981, Dallas: Summer Institute of Linguistics).

Healy, Dana.(2003). Teach Yourself Vietnamese, Hodder Education, London.

Nguyen, Đang Liêm. (1970). Vietnamese pronunciation. PALI language texts: Southeast Asia. Honolulu: University of Hawaii Press. 
Nguyễn, Đình-Hoà. (1955). Quốc-ngữ: The modern writing system in Vietnam. Washington, D. C.: Author.

Nguyễn, Đình-Hoà. (1996). Vietnamese. In P. T. Daniels, & W. Bright (Eds.), The world's writing systems, (pp. 691–699). New York: Oxford University Press. .
Nguyễn, Đình-Hoà. (1997). Vietnamese: Tiếng Việt không son phấn. Amsterdam: John Benjamins Publishing Company. .
Pham, Andrea Hoa. (2003). Vietnamese tone: A new analysis. Outstanding dissertations in linguistics. New York: Routledge. (Published version of author's 2001 PhD dissertation, University of Florida: Hoa, Pham. Vietnamese tone: Tone is not pitch). .
 

Thompson, Laurence E. (1991). A Vietnamese reference grammar. Seattle: University of Washington Press. Honolulu: University of Hawaii Press. . (Original work published 1965).
 

Further reading
 Nguyen, A. M. (2006). Let's learn the Vietnamese alphabet. Las Vegas: Viet Baby. 
 Shih, Virginia Jing-yi. Quoc Ngu Revolution: A Weapon of Nationalism in Vietnam''. 1991.

External links

Vietnamese Unicode FAQs

Latin alphabets
Vietnamese writing systems
Latin-script orthographies